Émilie Loit and Květa Peschke were the defending champions, but they did not compete together that year.

Loit partnering Nathalie Dechy lost in the Quarterfinals, and Peschke partnering Janette Husárová were eliminated in the first round.

Seeds

 Cara Black Liezel Huber (champions)
 Dinara Safina Katarina Srebotnik (quarterfinals, retired due to Safina's left hamstring strain)
 Janette Husárová Květa Peschke (first round)
 Nathalie Dechy Émilie Loit (quarterfinals)

Draw

Draw

Notes
The winners will receive $27,730 and 275 ranking points.
The runners-up will receive $14,900 and 190 ranking points.
The last direct acceptance team was Emmanuelle Gagliardi/Selima Sfar (combined ranking of 221st).
The player representative was Aravane Rezaï.

Doubles 2007
Open Gaz de France